Irrfan Khan (born Sahabzade Irfan Ali Khan; 7 January 1967  29 April 2020), also known simply as Irrfan, was an Indian film actor, known for his work predominantly in Hindi cinema, as well as his works in British films and Hollywood.

In a film career spanning almost thirty years and featuring in more than fifty domestic films, Khan has received numerous awards, including a National Film Award and Filmfare Awards in four categories. Film critics, contemporaries and other experts consider him to be one of the finest actors in Indian cinema for his versatile and natural acting. In 2011, he was awarded the Padma Shri, India's fourth highest civilian honour for his contribution to the field of arts.

Domestically, he made his screen debut with the Academy Award nominated film Salaam Bombay! (1988). Followed by a series of roles in films that failed to propel his career forward, he received critical acclaim for playing negative roles in the drama films Haasil (2003) and Maqbool (2004), for the former he won the Filmfare Award for Best Villain. The successful drama Life in a... Metro (2007) marked a turning point in Khan's career, earning him praise and several awards including the Filmfare Award for Best Supporting Actor. He rose to prominence with his portrayal of Paan Singh Tomar in the acclaimed biographical sports drama Paan Singh Tomar (2011), which garnered him the National Film Award for Best Actor and a Filmfare Critics Award for Best Actor. His performance in the BAFTA Award nominated romance The Lunchbox (2013) earned him universal acclaim by the critics and audiences. Khan went on to feature in the commercially and critically successful films Haider (2014), Gunday (2014), Piku (2015) and Talvar (2015). His highest-grossing Hindi release came with the critically acclaimed comedy-drama Hindi Medium (2017), which became a sleeper hit in India and China, which ranks among highest-grossing Indian films of all time and earned him praise for his performance, winning several awards. He received the Filmfare Award for Best Actor twice, for  Hindi Medium (2017) and for its spiritual sequel Angrezi Medium (2020).

Honours
 2011 – Padma Shri – India's fourth highest civilian honour from the Government of India.
 2017 – Honorary Award – Dubai International Film Festival
 2021 – Filmfare Lifetime Achievement Award

Awards and nominations

See also
 List of accolades received by Slumdog Millionaire
 List of accolades received by Piku

References

External links
 

Lists of awards received by Indian actor